Final Exam: A Surgeon's Reflections on Mortality is a 2007 book written by surgeon and liver specialist Pauline Chen. The Los Angeles Times described the main goal of the book as "to hold herself and fellow physicians accountable for providing better end-of-life care." She argues that "medical schools can and should do a much better job of preparing doctors to care for the dying."

References

External links
Review by The New York Times

2007 non-fiction books
American non-fiction books
Books about health care